Apamea magnirena is a moth of the family Noctuidae.

References

Moths described in 1943
Apamea (moth)